William Gurdon (12 October 1804 – 12 October 1884) was an English first-class cricketer who played for Cambridge University in one match in 1825, totalling 28 runs with a highest score of 15.

Gurdon was educated at Eton College and Downing College, Cambridge. After graduating at Cambridge he was admitted to the Inner Temple and was called to the Bar in 1829. He was recorder of Bury St Edmunds c. 1840–60 and a judge of the county court of Essex 1847–71. He lived at Brantham Court, Suffolk, and is buried in Brantham churchyard.

References

Bibliography

English cricketers of 1787 to 1825
Cambridge University cricketers
1804 births
1884 deaths
People educated at Eton College
Alumni of Downing College, Cambridge
English barristers
19th-century English judges
Cricketers from Norwich
Sportspeople from Bury St Edmunds
People from Brantham
County Court judges (England and Wales)
Burials in Suffolk